Brösarp is a locality situated in Tomelilla Municipality, Skåne County, Sweden near the Hallamölla waterfall, with 680 inhabitants in 2010.

References 

Populated places in Tomelilla Municipality
Populated places in Skåne County